Lewis is an unincorporated town, a post office, and a census-designated place (CDP) located in and governed by Montezuma County, Colorado, United States. The Lewis post office has the ZIP Code 81327. At the 2020 census, the population of the Lewis CDP was 257, down from 302 in 2010.

Geography
Lewis is in northern Montezuma County, on the northeast side of U.S. Route 491, which leads south  to Cortez, the county seat, and northwest  to Monticello, Utah. Colorado State Highway 184 leaves US 491 at the southern edge of the community and leads east  to Dolores.

Demographics

See also

Outline of Colorado
Index of Colorado-related articles
State of Colorado
Colorado cities and towns
Colorado census designated places
Colorado counties
Montezuma County, Colorado
Old Spanish National Historic Trail

References

External links

Lewis, Colorado Mining Claims And Mines
Montezuma County website

Census-designated places in Montezuma County, Colorado
Census-designated places in Colorado